Charles Frederick Wolcott (September 29, 1906 in Flint, United States – January 26, 1987 in Haifa, Israel) was a music composer who served as a member of the Universal House of Justice, the supreme governing body of the Baháʼí Faith, between 1963 and 1987.

Early life
Wolcott was born in Flint, Michigan, USA. Michigan and attended the University of Michigan where he formed his own band “Charley Wolcott and His Wolverines” in 1924–27. Following his graduation, he joined Jean Goldkette's band as a jazz pianist and scored music for such members of that group as Bix Beiderbecke, Joe Venuti, Tommy and Jimmy Dorsey as well as becoming an arranger for Paul Whiteman,  Benny Goodman and the Dorsey Brothers. He later joined Johnny Green's band as well and the two became good friends. Wolcott then went to radio, arranging for Al Jolson, George Burns and Gracie Allen and Rudy Vallee.

Hollywood career
He moved to Hollywood sometime between 1935 and 1937 and soon began working at Walt Disney Studios writing music for cartoon shorts, then orchestrating feature films such as Pinocchio, and Bambi. By 1944, he had become General Musical Director at Disney Studios on films such as Saludos Amigos, The Three Caballeros, Make Mine Music, Song of the South and Fun and Fancy Free. Wolcott had a US hit single in 1944, with "Tico-Tico"

In 1950, he transferred to MGM Studios as Associate General Musical Director, and in 1958 became General Musical Director.

In 1950, he transferred to MGM Studios as Associate General Musical Director before succeeding Johnny Green as general music director in 1958. While there, he was credited with introducing rock-and-roll to the motion picture screen, prevailing on the producer of Blackboard Jungle to incorporate Bill Haley's recording of “Rock Around the Clock” into the 1955 film that Wolcott also scored. He also wrote the love theme from 1958 adaptation of Cat on a Hot Tin Roof In 1960, Wolcott hit the US, Hot 100 with the song, "Ruby Duby Du", which peaked at #41.

Spiritual life
Wolcott, who Green called “a man of great spiritual proportions,” left Hollywood altogether in 1960 to devote full time to the U.S. Baha’i Assembly, which had elected him national secretary. In 1961, he was elected to the faith's International Council and moved to Haifa where he remained until his death in 1987.

He was buried in Haifa soon after his death in keeping with Baha’i beliefs.

Notes

External links
 Sheila Banani poetry, U.S.A. from Arts Dialogue, March 1995, pages 24 – 26
 

1906 births
1987 deaths
People from Flint, Michigan
American Bahá'ís
Members of the Universal House of Justice
American religious leaders
American composers
Animation composers
Walt Disney Animation Studios people
20th-century American composers
20th-century Bahá'ís